Tread plate, also known as checker plate and diamond plate, is a type of metal stock with a regular pattern or lines on one side for slip resistance. The most common alloy used for aluminum tread plate is 6061, although 5086-H34 and 3003-H231 are also used. Diamond plate is usually steel, stainless steel or aluminium. Steel types are normally made by hot rolling, although modern manufacturers also make a raised and pressed diamond design.

The added texture reduces the risk of slipping, making diamond plate a solution for stairs, catwalks, walkways, and ramps in industrial settings. Its non-skid properties mean that diamond plate is frequently used on the interior of ambulances and on the footplates of firetrucks. Additional applications include truck beds and trailer floors. 

Tread plate can also be used decoratively, particularly highly polished aluminum variants. Manufactured in plastic, diamond plate is marketed as an interlocking tile system to be installed on garage floors, trailers, and exercise rooms.

Tread plate may be used for surface protection against damage from foot traffic or harmful chemicals. Manufactured with polymer variants, inter-locking diamond plate tile is used in areas with high surface-erosive traffic.

"Diamond plate" can also refer to similar anti-slip textures.

See also 
 Structural steel
 Embossing (manufacturing)

References 

Safety equipment
Steels
Occupational safety and health
Automotive_accessories